The Torts (Interference with Goods) Act 1977 was an Act of Parliament to amend the law in England, Wales and Northern Ireland concerning conversion and other torts affecting goods.

Under the act, detinue was abolished.

See also 
Trespass in English law

References 

English tort law
United Kingdom Acts of Parliament 1977